The Rallye Mont-Blanc Morzine is a yearly motor rally held in the month of September in Morzine, Haute-Savoie. It is often held as part of the French Rally Championship. It began in 1947 with the Rally Paris-Evian, and it eventually became the Rallye. Formerly held in Annecy, this event moved to Morzine in 1989 where it adopted its current name in 1994.

One of the oldest continuing rallies in France, this rally has attracted famous names from the world of rally driving such as Sébastien Loeb, Stéphane Sarrazin, Philippe Bugalski and Pierre Campana. All the winners to date have been French with the exceptions of the Belgian Lucien Bianchi and Swiss Jean Krucker. Bugalski is the most successful driver in the events history with five wins between 1993 and 2000.

As well as part of the French Rally Championship, the Rallye Mont-Blanc was included in the European Rally Championship from 1988 to 1996.

Recent years

2011
In 2011, Pierre Campana, driving the same Mini Cooper WRC that won the Richard Burns Memorial Rally in England, added to his success. He took the lead after the previous leader Dany Snobeck crashed out. Gilles Nantet and Ludovic Gal were second and third respectively and it was Nantet's maiden ascent to the podium.

2012
In 2012, Stéphane Sarrazin who won previously in 2004 took another commanding victory in the Peugeot 307 WRC with co-driver Benjamin Veillas.

2013
In 2013, Julien Maurin won for the first time with co-driver Nicolas Klinger. Eric Brunson and Pierre Roché joined him on the podium. Maurin was the leader since SS2.

2014
In 2014, Julien Maurin won for the second consecutive time, also leading from the second stage and beating rival competitors. The second placed driver Jean-Marie Cuoq was joined on the podium by Lionel Baud.

2015
In 2015, the 67th running of this event, Stéphane Sarrazin won it for the third time, but the veteran driver Frédéric Comte died in a crash on SS2. After the agreement of the family, the rally was relaunched. Joining Sarrazin and his co-driver Jacques-Julien Renucci on the podium was Jean-Marie Cuoq, the runner-up from last year, and Yoann Bonato. The third placed co-driver, Denis Giraudet, made it on the podium for the first time in 21 years.

2016
In 2016, this rally was won for the first time by Yoann Bonato driving a Citroën DS3 R5. Earlier his fellow Frenchman Sylvain Michel battled with him for the lead, but had fallen down to eleventh by the start of the second leg, eliminating any hopes of victory.

List of winners
Sourced in part from:

Fatalities
In 1999, driver Mark Champeau died in a road accident during the reconnaissance. 
In 2015, driver Frédéric Comte died on Stage 2 after a big accident. His accident came in the wake of two other similar tragedies that happened the same week. One of rally's darkest weeks that blackened preparations for Rally Australia.

References

External links
 Website

Montblancmorzine
Montblancmorzine
Sport in Haute-Savoie